Jeetu Verma is a Bollywood actor who worked in films like Humraaz, Soldier, Taarzan: The Wonder Car and Rohit Shetty's Bol Bachchan. In 2020, he appeared in Amazon Prime video original show Mirzapur.

Career
Jeetu Verma is an Indian actor, who has worked predominantly in Bollywood. He has worked in popular movies like Son Of Sardar, Bol Bachchan. He recently starred in Amazon Prime original show Mirzapur.

Filmography

 Sapoot (1996) as Manik
Bade Miyan Chote Miyan (1998) as Henchman of Zoravar
 Soldier (1998 Indian film) as Jojo
 Rajakumarudu (Telugu movie) (1999)
Badal (2000) as Rafiq Terrorist
Arjun Pandit (1999 film) 
Kunwara (2000) as Henchman of Prithvi Thakur
Deewaanapan (2001)
Kranti (2002)
 Humraaz (2002) as Jojo Fernandes
 Talaash: The Hunt Begins...(2003) as Junior
 Taarzan: The Wonder Car (2004) as Jojo D'Costa
 Kisna: The Warrior Poet (2005)
 The Fall (2006)
Shaadi Karke Phas Gaya Yaar (2006)
Team: The Force (2009)
Sheetalbhabi.com (2010) as Vishal (Special Appearance in the beginning of the film)
 Bodyguard (2011)
 Bol Bachchan (2012)
 Son Of Sardar (2012)
 Zanjeer (2013)
 Jai Ho (2014)
 Action Jackson (2014) as Chotu
 Kis Kisko Pyaar Karoon (2015)
 Rangoon (2017)
 Raabta (2017)
 Mirzapur (TV series) (2020)

References

External links

Indian male film actors
Living people
Year of birth missing (living people)